Laetesia peramoena is a species of sheet weaver found in New Zealand. It was described by O.P.-Cambridge in 1879.

References

Linyphiidae
Spiders of New Zealand
Spiders described in 1879